The 2022 PCS season was the third year of the Pacific Championship Series (PCS), a professional esports league for the MOBA PC game League of Legends.

The spring split began with the first day of the regular season on 11 February and concluded with the spring finals on 17 April.

The summer split began with the first day of the regular season on 1 July and concluded with the summer finals on 4 September.

Spring

Teams and rosters 
Half of the teams in the PCS withdrew from the league prior to the 2022 season, including the PCS' representatives from the Philippines and Thailand. Berjaya Dragons, BOOM Esports, Hong Kong Attitude, Liyab Esports, and Machi Esports all withdrew from the PCS, and were replaced by CTBC Flying Oyster, Deep Cross Gaming, Frank Esports, Meta Falcon Team, and SEM9. Alpha Esports also rebranded as Hurricane Gaming.

Regular season standings 
 Format: Double round robin, best-of-one

Playoffs 
 Format: Double elimination
 Winner qualifies for the 2022 Mid-Season Invitational

Ranking

Summer

Teams and rosters 
Dewish Team acquired the PCS spot of Hurricane Gaming prior to the start of the summer split.

Regular season standings 
 Format: Double round robin, best-of-one

Playoffs 
 Format: Double elimination
 Winner and runner-up qualify for the 2022 World Championship

Ranking

References 

League of Legends
2022 multiplayer online battle arena tournaments
Pacific Championship Series seasons
Pacific Championship Series season, 2022